Phyllis Griffiths was an English archer and archery coach. In 1986, aged 64 or 67, she entered the Guinness Book of Records by setting a world record for the most arrows shot in a 24-hour period. She scored 31,000 in 76 Portsmouth rounds.

Life
Griffiths lived in Holsworthy, Devon, where she taught archery to local disabled people at The Fun Club. In 2007 she was honoured with a Grand National Archery Society plaque for her contributions to British archery.

References

Year of birth missing
Possibly living people
English archers
English female archers